Computer Aided Development Corporation Ltd. (Cadcorp) is a British owned and run company established in 1991. Cadcorp has its headquarters in Stevenage, Hertfordshire, U.K. Cadcorp has a network of distributors and value added resellers (VARs) around the world.

Cadcorp is an ISO 9001:2000 and ISO/IEC 27001:2005 certified company,  a Microsoft SQL Server Spatial Partner, an Ordnance Survey Licensed Developer Partner, and a corporate member of the Association for Geographic Information in the UK.

History 

Cadcorp's first product was a Microsoft Windows-based CAD system called Wincad. All rights to the product were sold in 1994. Wincad development and maintenance, carried out latterly by Informatix Inc, Japan, through their UK subsidiary under the brand name MicroGDS, was stopped in March 2013. After selling Wincad, Cadcorp moved on to developing geographic information system (GIS) software. The first version of Cadcorp SIS – Spatial Information System ("Cadcorp SIS") was released in 1995.

The leadership team successfully completed a management buyout of the company in May 2015.

Market 

Cadcorp SIS has applications in the following UK markets

 Government (local, municipal and central)
 Emergency Services
 Land and Property
 Insurance
 Oil and Gas
 Utilities
 Maritime
 National Mapping Agencies

Products 
In July 2020, Cadcorp SIS continued its support for data items of the Ordnance Survey (OS). Cadcorp SIS Desktop links directly to the recently launched Ordnance Survey Data Center in its latest software update. It has dedicated guides for linking to the OS Features API, the OS Maps API and the OS Vector Tile API. Both the OS Maps API and the OS Vector Tile API are used in the British National Grid and the coordinate database structures for "Web Mercator".

Open geospatial consortium 

Cadcorp has been a member of the Open Geospatial Consortium (OGC) since 1997. In 2004, Cadcorp's technical director, Martin Daly was awarded the OGC Kenneth G. Gardels Award, made annually to an individual who has made outstanding contributions to advancing the OGC vision of geographic information fully integrated into the world's information systems.

Several versions of the Cadcorp SIS product suite are certified OGC compliant in the categories of:

 Simple Features for OLE/COM
 Grid Coverage Service
 Coordinate Transformation Service
 Web Map Service
 Web Feature Service

Cadcorp SIS also implements support for:

 Web Map Context Documents
 Geography Markup Language
 Simple Features
 Web Coverage Service

Product overview 

Cadcorp SIS is available in different forms:

desktop
server
web mapping
cloud hosting
 developer tools
 specialised applications

GIS data management tool 
In February 2020, Cadcorp SIS ETL (Extract, Transform, Load) is the newest contribution to a broad variety of vertical technologies unique to Cadcorp.

In May 2020, Cadcorp also expanded its cloud services to include SIS Desktop, with the increasing growth of cloud computing technologies.

References

External links 
Cadcorp website

GIS companies
Software companies of the United Kingdom